Gosha may refer to:
Somali Bantu
Hideo Gosha, Japanese film director
Five Chariots, Chinese constellation
 Gosha woman, women kept in purdah in southern India
Gosha, the diminutive form of the Russian given name Georgy
"Gosha", a 2018 song by Snot
Big Floppa, popular internet Caracal and meme